Low Hesket is a village in the English county of Cumbria.

This is a former Roman road, and a milestone from that era has been discovered there inscribed IMP C FL VAL CONSTANTINO P F INV AVG, which expands to Imperator Caesar Flavius Valerius Constantinus Pius Felix Invictus Augustus, dating it from the time of emperor Constantine I, who ruled from 307 to 337.

Governance
Low Hesket is in the parliamentary constituency of Penrith and the Border. Neil Hudson was elected its Conservative Member of Parliament at the 2019 General Election, replacing Rory Stewart.

For the European Parliament its residents voted to elect MEP's for the North West England constituency.

Administratively, Low Hesket forms part of the civil parish of Hesket, which, in turn, is part of the district of Eden.

See also

Listed buildings in Hesket, Cumbria

References

External links 

Its entry in the Cumbria Directory

Villages in Cumbria
Eden District